Kevin Corby (born 12 July 1959) is a former English cricketer.  Corby was a right-handed batsman who fielded as a wicket-keeper.  He was born in Newcastle upon Tyne, Northumberland.

Corby made his debut for Northumberland in the 1977 Minor Counties Championship against the Lancashire Second XI.  Corby played Minor counties cricket for Northumberland from 1979 to 1991, which included 55 Minor Counties Championship appearances and 9 MCCA Knockout Trophy matches.  He made his List A debut against Middlesex in the 1984 NatWest Trophy.  He made 3 further List A appearances, the last coming against Surrey in the 1989 NatWest Trophy.  In his 4 List A matches, he scored 10 runs at an average of 5.00, with a high score of 7.  Behind the stumps he took 6 catches.

References

External links
Kevin Corby at ESPNcricinfo
Kevin Corby at CricketArchive

1959 births
Living people
Cricketers from Newcastle upon Tyne
English cricketers
Northumberland cricketers
Wicket-keepers